The Linda Vista Shopping Center is a neighborhood shopping center San Diego and one of the first in the United States, built in 1943. It was predated in California only by the Broadway & 87th Street shopping center in South Los Angeles opened in seven years earlier in 1936.

Linda Vista was dedicated by Eleanor Roosevelt. Pasadena architects Karl F. Giberson and Whitney P. Smith designed the center. It is located in the neighborhood of Linda Vista, an area whose population soared in 1941, when 3000 homes were constructed in less than a year to house aircraft workers and their families. Linda Vista was America's largest defense housing project during World War II, and the world's largest low-cost modern housing development, according to the San Diego Historical Society.

The design was innovative for the time and place, with Pasadena architect Whitney Smith following garden city principles, with parking around the edges and a landscaped "main street" or "town green" interior with a lawn, trees, and an arc-shaped, bench-lined covered promenade. Uniform paint color, shopfronts, and signage were also relatively new concepts. The center measured  of leasable space, consisting of 10 specialty stores, a dime store, supermarket and small branch of San Diego-based Walker Scott department store (originally the independent "Linda Vista department store"). There was parking for 261 cars around the entire perimeter, also an innovative feature.

The center won a Creditable Mention Award from the Southern California Chapter of the American Institute of Architects in January 1947.

Much (but not all) of the complex was demolished and replaced in 1972. It still thrives with many shops now having an Asian-centric offering, reflecting the evolving population in the area.

References

Defunct shopping malls in the United States
Demolished shopping malls in the United States
Buildings and structures demolished in 1972
Shopping malls in San Diego County, California
Neighborhood shopping centers